Clay Township is one of nine townships in Pike County, Indiana, United States. As of the 2010 census, its population was 349 and it contained 156 housing units.

Geography
The White River defines the north border of the township, as well as the north border of Pike County.

Unincorporated towns
 Union at 
(This list is based on USGS data and may include former settlements.)

Cemeteries
The township contains these five cemeteries: Bethlehem, Catt, Frederick, Independent Order of Odd Fellows and Odd Fellows.

School districts
 Pike County School Corporation

Political districts
 State House District 64
 State Senate District 48

References
 
 United States Census Bureau 2009 TIGER/Line Shapefiles
 IndianaMap

External links
 Indiana Township Association
 United Township Association of Indiana
 City-Data.com page for Clay Township

Townships in Pike County, Indiana
Jasper, Indiana micropolitan area
Townships in Indiana